Pablo González may refer to:

 Pablo González Velázquez (1664–1727), Spanish Baroque sculptor
 Pablo González Garza (1879–1950), Mexican general and Governor of San Luis Potosí
 Pablo González Cuesta (born 1968), Spanish writer
 Pablo González (conductor) (born 1975), Spanish conductor
 Pablo González (tennis) (born 1982), Colombian tennis player
 Pablo González (Argentine footballer) (born 1985), Argentine footballer
 Pablo González (Chilean footballer) (born 1986), Chilean footballer
 Pablo González (footballer, born 1993), Spanish footballer
 Pablo González (Uruguayan footballer) (born 1995), Uruguayan football central midfielder
 Pablo González (Mexican footballer) (born 1992), Mexican footballer

See also
 Pablo Couñago (born 1979), Spanish footballer born Pablo González Couñago